FC Stary Oskol was a Russian football team from Stary Oskol. It played professionally on two occasions, in 1990 and 1993. Their best result was 13th place in Zone 3 of the Russian Second Division in 1993.

Team name history
 1990–1994: FC Metallurg Stary Oskol
 1995: FC Anteks Stary Oskol
 1996–2002: FC Oskol Stary Oskol
 2003–2007: FC Stary Oskol

External links
  Team history at KLISF

Association football clubs established in 1990
Association football clubs disestablished in 2008
Defunct football clubs in Russia
Sport in Stary Oskol
1990 establishments in Russia
2008 disestablishments in Russia